Gaston Van Roy (9 February 1916 – 6 December 1989) was a Belgian sports shooter. He competed in the trap event at the 1952 Summer Olympics.

References

1916 births
1989 deaths
Belgian male sport shooters
Olympic shooters of Belgium
Shooters at the 1952 Summer Olympics
Sportspeople from The Hague